Basket Pond is a small lake north-northwest of Rock Valley in Delaware County, New York. It drains south via an unnamed creek which flows into the North Branch Basket Creek.

See also
 List of lakes in New York

References 

Lakes of New York (state)
Lakes of Delaware County, New York